The 1911–12 Luxembourg National Division was the 3rd season of top level association football in Luxembourg.

Overview
It was performed by 4 teams, and US Hollerich won the championship.

League standings

References
Luxembourg - List of final tables (RSSSF)

1911-12
1911–12 in European association football leagues
Nat